Jarmil Michael Burghauser (born Jarmil Michael Mokrý, 21 October 1921, Písek19 February 1997, Prague) was a Czech composer, conductor, and musicologist.

After the short-lived Prague Spring, he incurred the disfavor of his country's Communist regime and had to adopt the pseudonym Michal Hájků in order to write a series of compositions in a style which evoked earlier periods of music, called Storia apocrifa della musica Boema.

Cataloguing of  Dvořák's works 

Burghauser created a reliable catalog of works by Antonín Dvořák. It is to replace the traditional  opus number, which is not only incomplete but also confusing for the case of Dvořák. Today academic references to Dvořák's works often use the Burghauser number from the catalogue.

See also 
 List of compositions by Antonín Dvořák by catalogue number

Czech composers
Czech male composers
Czech conductors (music)
Male conductors (music)
Czech musicologists
Classical music catalogues
People from Písek
1921 births
1997 deaths
20th-century conductors (music)
20th-century composers
20th-century musicologists
20th-century Czech male musicians